Trino Cruz Seruya (born 1960) is a Gibraltarian poet.

Biography 
Born in Gibraltar in 1960. Of mixed Sephardi, English, Italian and Spanish ancestry, he studied in Liverpool and London before returning to his birthplace in 1983. He has been called a main example of the Spanish-language poetry both in Gibraltar and in the wider scope of the territories circling the Strait of the same name. Commentator of Maghrebian poetry, he has also translated works by authors such as Hassan Najmi and Saadi Yousef. One of the defining traits of his literary work is miscegenation. Trino Cruz has given the opinion that "Gibraltarian literature is a literature nonata" (not yet born), attributing that status to political forces blocking the "creative instincts".

Works 
A list of published compilations of poems authored by Cruz follows:
 Lecturas del espacio profanado (Sevilla, 1992)
 Breve antología. Colección Cuadernos del Aula de Literatura José Cadalso, núm. 19. (San Roque, 1993)
 Como la mirada que ha de pervertir este espejo. Actas del II Ciclo de Conferencias Universitarias del Campo de Gibraltar, Instituto de Estudios Campogibraltareños (Algeciras; 1996).
 Rihla. Colección Abalorios de poesía (San Roque, 2003).
 Rihla (translation of Khalid Raissouni; Tangiers, 2015)

References

Bibliography 
 
 
 
 
 
 



Gibraltarian writers
Spanish-language poets
1960 births
Living people